Ripple may refer to:

Science and technology
 Capillary wave, commonly known as ripple, a wave traveling along the phase boundary of a fluid
 Ripple, more generally a disturbance, for example of spacetime in gravitational waves
 Ripple (electrical), residual periodic variation in DC voltage during ac to dc conversion
 Ripple current, pulsed current draw caused by some non-linear devices and circuits
 Frequency-domain ripple
 Ringing (signal), oscillation of a signal, particularly in the step response
 Polarization ripples, appearing after irradiation of a solid by energy flux (laser, ions, etc.)
 Ripple marks, as identified in sediments and sedimentary rocks
 Ripple (payment protocol), a real-time payment system by Ripple Labs
 Ripple control, a form of electrical load management
 Various brainwave patterns, including those which follow sharp waves in the hippocampus
 Ripple I and Ripple II, 1962 US nuclear bomb tests in Operation Dominic

Organizations
 Ripple (charitable organisation), a non-profit click-to-donate internet site and search engine 
 Ripple Labs, the firm that created the Ripple payment protocol
 Ripple Foods, a brand of pea-protein dairy alternative products

Arts and entertainment
 "Ripple" (Naruto episode), an episode in an anime series
 The Ripple (newspaper), the student newspaper at the University of Leicester
 Ripple (My Little Pony)
 Ripples (TV series)
 Ripples (musical), a musical comedy theatrical production
 Ripple, a phenomenon in JoJo's Bizarre Adventure

Music
 Ripple (band), an American soul/funk band
 "Ripple" (song), a 1970 song by the Grateful Dead from their album American Beauty
 "Ripple", a song from the album Priest=Aura by The Church
 "Ripples...", a song from the album A Trick of the Tail by Genesis

Places
 Ripple, Kent, a village in England
 Ripple, Worcestershire, a village in England
 Ripples, New Brunswick, Canada
 Ripple River, US

Other uses
 Ripple effect, the socio-educational phenomenon
 USS Ripple, several US Navy ships
 Ripple, a former brand of flavored fortified wine

People with the surname
 Jimmy Ripple (1909–1959), baseball player
 Kenneth Francis Ripple (born 1943), Senior United States Circuit Judge
 Mark Ripple (born 1967), businessperson and author
 Richard E. Ripple (1931–2010), American educational psychologist
 Charlie Ripple (1920–1979), pitcher in Major League Baseball
 Ezra H. Ripple (1842–1909), Pennsylvania businessman, politician and soldier
 John Ripple (1897–1965), college football player
 William J. Ripple (born 1952), professor of ecology

See also
 Ripple tank, a glass tank of water demonstrating the basic properties of waves
 Raspberry Ripple, a flavour of ice-cream
 Ripple Island (disambiguation)